De leugen van Pierrot is a 1922 Dutch silent film directed by Maurits Binger.

Cast
 Adelqui Migliar
 Esther De Boer-van Rijk - Pierrots blinde moeder
 Henny Schroeder
 Jan van Dommelen
 Renee Spiljar - Een kleine Columbine
 Martijn de Vries - Een kleine Pierot

External links 
 

Dutch silent feature films
1922 films
Dutch black-and-white films
Films directed by Maurits Binger